Chalarus pughi is a species of fly in the family Pipunculidae.

Distribution
Europe.

References

Pipunculidae
Insects described in 1966
Diptera of Europe